Assassin is thrash metal group from Düsseldorf, Germany. Founded in 1983, they notably released four albums on Steamhammer Records and one on Massacre Records.

Discography
 The Upcoming Terror (1987, Steamhammer Records)
 Interstellar Experience (1988, Steamhammer Records)
 The Club (2005)
 Breaking The Silence (2011, Steamhammer Records)
 Combat Cathedral (2016, Steamhammer Records)
 Bestia Immundis (2020, Massacre Records)

References

External links
Official website
 

German thrash metal musical groups
Culture in Düsseldorf
Musical groups established in 1983
Massacre Records artists